Interference is an Irish band based around the late singer-songwriter Fergus O'Farrell.

The band is featured in the Academy Award-winning movie Once. Amidst the performances by the main characters, played by the Swell Season duo of Glen Hansard and Markéta Irglová, Interference have a cameo moment and play O'Farrell’s song "Gold".

Interference have also had songs included in the soundtracks for Alan Gilsenan’s All Souls Day and Damien O’Donnell’s Inside I'm Dancing, both critically acclaimed films. A collaboration with Glen Hansard, the song ‘Don’t Go Down’ features in another John Carney film, Sing Street.

Interference have appeared three times on the Irish television show Other Voices. One such appearance was a one-hour Interference special which led to the release of the live CD Interference Live in Dingle: Songs from Another Room.

In 2018, Trinity College Dublin’s Music Society awarded Interference an Honorary Patronage to the College faculty in recognition of their contribution to Irish Music.

A film documentary on the life of O'Farrell entitled Breaking Out was released in November 2021. Filmed over ten years, it follows O'Farrell and his band from their own recording studio set-up in Dublin in the early '90's to their triumphant performance in Radio City Music Hall in 2008 with Hansard and the Swell Season and onwards to the last recording sessions, O'Farrell’s death from muscular dystrophy in early 2016 and the release in 2017 of their last album The Sweet Spot. To accompany the film a soundtrack album has been compiled, featuring the 31 interference tracks heard in the film.  Eleven of these have been re-mastered by 12-time Grammy award winning Bob Ludwig in Gateway Mastering Studios, Portland, Maine, USA.

Interference still perform live with Hansard often assuming lead vocals, or as their alter ego Dogtail Soup.

Once & "Gold"
Interference outings became sporadic as O’Farrell's health caused long periods of inactivity. There was a very special third Other Voices appearance where Interference with a new collective of mainly Cork and West Cork musicians performed new material they had been working on for their second album. That night introduced the songs "Gold", "Don't Go Down" and "Sail On", alongside many old favourites. O’Farrell was joined on stage by band members Paul Tiernan, James O'Leary, Maurice Seezer, Marja Gaynor, Darren McCarthy, Anthony Noonan, Bertrand Galen, Colin Vearncombe (aka Black) and Camilla Griehsel. 

Many Interference songs are written with lyricist Malcolm MacClancy, with whom O’Farrell had worked since they met at school. The song "Gold", however, is an O'Farrell solo composition, and it features in John Carney Box Office Hit film Once. Released in 2007, the film features a house party scene where Interference perform the song. The song features strongly in Once: The Musical. The success of "Gold" led O'Farrell to sign a worldwide publishing deal with Warner Chappell Music. 

Glen Hansard was touring the world with his band The Swell Season on the back of the success of Once and invited O'Farrell and interference to join them in Radio City Music Hall and Tower Theatre in Philadelphia for the final shows of the tour. The Swell Season was made up of the duo of Hansard and Irglova along with Marja Gaynor and Bertrand Galen who were also members of O’Farrell's interference collective.

DogTail Soup
O’Farrell co-wrote and often shared his stage with Colin Vearncombe (aka Black), David Bickley (Hyperborea), Gavin Friday and The Man Seezer, Maria Doyle Kennedy & Kieran Kennedy, Glen Hansard, Liam O'Maonlai, Mundy, Nina Hynes and Paul Tiernan. O'Farrell, Vearncombe, Griehsel, Seezer and Paul Tiernan came up with the idea of creating a group where each of them would alternate the role of singer, performing their own songs as well as covers. This was to be called DogTail Soup, a name derived from a line in one of Vearncombe's 'Black' songs, "Cold Chicken Skin".

This alternate version of interference has garnered its own very loyal following West Cork and has toured the Czech Republic and Slovakia. Several more band members have come and gone, including Darren McCarthy (upright bass), Gareth Hughes, Gareth Forsyth and Paul Griffin (guitars), Karl Penny (drums).

Czech Republic
Interference and DogTail Soup became popular in the Czech Republic and Slovakia in the 2000s, following several tours, accompanied by Maria Doyle Kennedy, Mark Geary, Glen Hansard and Marketa Irglova. The Interference performance on 'Irish night' at the Náměšť Folk Festival is available on a live CD called Irsky Den. O’Farrell often said this night in the beautiful Czech Castle was his best night on stage ever.

Avian Attak
O’Farrell teamed up with David Bickley and James O’Leary in 2014 forming a new musical collective calling themselves Avian Attak, creating atmospheric electronica. They have released two albums to date, Avian Attak in 2015 and Spinning World in 2019, as well as some EP CD singles.

The Film: Breaking Out
Interference performed infrequently as did DogTail Soup throughout the remaining noughties and into the teens. Work continued on the elusive new album. This was to prove a near decade-long journey. O’Farrell’s health was seriously deteriorating, necessitating long periods of rest. Meanwhile a film project had commenced, when Michael McCormack began filming O’Farrell's various projects, a process that went on for over ten years. The resulting award-winning documentary tells the story of Interference, from O'Farrell's schooldays when he met O’Leary and MacClancy first met, through to the final recording sessions with Glen Hansard and members of the Frames.

Entitled Breaking Out, the film was due a cinema release from Element Pictures in 2020 but was postponed due to Covid-19 restrictions, eventually released in November 2021. The film release will be accompanied by a supporting live tour from the band, fronted by Glen Hansard. There will be an 11-track soundtrack album, chosen from the 31 songs featured in the film.

Deaths of O'Farrell and Vearncombe 
Colin Vearncombe lost his life after a car crash in January 2016 as O’Farrell, Hansard and The Frames were recording the last of the album sessions. O'Farrell died only days later on 2 February.

A year after these events, 32 musicians took to the stage in Cork Opera House to celebrate O’Farrell and his work. During the near 4-hour show, vocal duties were shared by Glen Hansard, Camilla Griehsel, Paul Tiernan and Maurice Seezer. The band was joined by Liam Ó'Maonlaí, Mundy, Jerry Fish, Alan Tobin, Ciara O'Driscoll, Katell Keineg, Joe O'Leary, Gavin Harte, Maurice Culligan, Sara Caccamo, Noreen O'Donnell and Mick O'Callaghan, James O'Leary, John Fitzgerald, Anto Noonan, Cal McCarthy, Bertrand Galen, Marja Gaynor, Colm McCaughey, Darren McCarthy, Jerry Fehily, Graham Hopkins, Justin Healy, Herbie Macken, Jack O'Rourke and Niall O'Driscoll. Many other Interference collaborators sat in the audience. There was a repeat performance in Vicar Street, Dublin, a couple of days later, both shows completely selling out. The shows were organised by Interference archivist Marc McDonald and compered by Philip King. 

To coincide with these performances, the second Interference album, The Sweet Spot, produced by DanDan Fitzgerald, was released on 2 February, 2017. 

The Band has continued to perform with Glen Hansard on lead vocals, selling out every show they’ve played both in Ireland and abroad. Shows included 2017’s Electric Picnic and the 2018 Clonakilty Guitar Festival, following which the band returned to the Czech Republic to headline across a series of Festivals over ten days. 

In 2018 Interference were awarded an honorary patronage to the Trinity College Dublin Musical Society in honor of their contribution to Irish Music.

References

1984 establishments in Ireland
Musical groups from County Cork
Musical groups established in 1984